is a railway station in the city of Kosai, Shizuoka Prefecture, Japan, operated by Central Japan Railway Company (JR Tōkai).

Lines
Araimachi Station is served by the Tōkaidō Main Line, and is located  272.9 kilometers from the starting point of the line at Tokyo Station.

Station layout
The station has a side platform serving Track 1, and an island platform serving Track 2 and Track 3. The platforms are connected by a footbridge. The station building has automated ticket machines, TOICA automated turnstiles and a staffed ticket office.

Platforms

Adjacent stations

|-
!colspan=5|Central Japan Railway Company

History
On September 1, 1888, the section of the Tōkaidō Main Line connecting Hamamatsu Station with Ōbu Station was completed. Araimachi Station was established on January 10, 1915, for both passenger service and freight. Freight service was discontinued on April 26, 1971.

Station numbering was introduced to the section of the Tōkaidō Line operated JR Central in March 2018; Araimachi Station was assigned station number CA38.

Passenger statistics
In fiscal 2017, the station was used by an average of 2252 passengers daily (boarding passengers only).

Surrounding area
Lake Hamana
Japan National Route 301

See also
 List of Railway Stations in Japan

References

Yoshikawa, Fumio. Tokaido-sen 130-nen no ayumi. Grand-Prix Publishing (2002) .

External links

  

Railway stations in Japan opened in 1915
Railway stations in Shizuoka Prefecture
Tōkaidō Main Line
Stations of Central Japan Railway Company
Kosai, Shizuoka